The 2020 season was the 13th season for the Indian Premier League franchise Rajasthan Royals. The Rajasthan Royals are sometimes considered as the "moneyball" team of the IPL. The Royals are known to unearth obscure, high potential talent team. Steve Smith led the team. The team finished at bottom of the table with 6 wins and 8 losses. Sanju Samson scored the most runs with 375 runs and Jofra Archer took the most wickets with 2020 and earned the Player Of The Tournament.

Background

Player retention and transfers 

The Rajasthan Royals retained 11 players and released 11.

Retained Steve Smith, Sanju Samson, Jofra Archer, Ben Stokes, Jos Buttler, Riyan Parag, Shashank Singh, Shreyas Gopal, Mahipal Lomror, Varun Aaron, Manan Vohra.

Released Ashton Turner, Oshane Thomas, Shubham Ranjane, Prashant Chopra, Ish Sodhi, Aryaman Birla, Jaydev Unadkat, Rahul Tripathi, Stuart Binny, Liam Livingstone, Sudheshan Midhun, Ajinkya Rahane.

Auction
The franchise purchased the most number of the players at the IPL 2020 Auction, signing a further 11.

Auction Robin Uthappa, Jaydev Unadkat, Yashasvi Jaiswal, Anuj Rawat, Akash Singh, Kartik Tyagi, David Miller, Oshane Thomas, Anirudha Joshi, Andrew Tye, Tom Curran

Indian Premier League

Offseason
On 13 March 2020, the BCCI postponed the tournament until 15 April, in view of the ongoing coronavirus pandemic. On 14 April 2020, Narendra Modi said that the lockdown in India would last until at least 3 May 2020, with the tournament postponed further. The following day, the BCCI suspended the tournament indefinitely due to the pandemic.

On 17 May 2020, the Indian government relaxed nation-wide restrictions on sports events, allowing events to take place behind closed doors. On 24 May, Indian sports minister Kiren Rijiju stated that the decision on whether or not to allow the tournament to be conducted in 2020 will be made by the Indian government based on "the situation of the pandemic". In June 2020, the BCCI confirmed that their preference was to host the tournament in India, possibly between September and October. On 24 July 2020, it was confirmed that the tournament would start from 19 September 2020.

Group stage
On 22 September, the Rajasthan Royals started their season campaign defeating Chennai Super Kings by 16 runs. Steven Smith lost the toss and was put to bat. Rajasthan cruised past 100, and Sanju Samson posted a 74 off 32 balls before getting out, and Smith also got 69 off 47 balls as Royals posted a daunting 216 at the end of their 20 overs. Jofra Archer 27 in 8 balls and finished strongly for the royals, scoring 30 runs in the last over. Super Kings started off rapidly in their chase, getting 56 runs in the first six overs without losing a wicket. Once again Faf du Plessis got a half-century, and at the end they got to 200/6. On 27 September, Rajasthan Royals recorded their second win by chasing 223, this time it was Sanju Samson again who scored 85 runs, who played an instrumental role in Royals winning the match. On 30 September 2020 Rajasthan recorded their first loss against Kolkata Knight Riders. Kolkata batted first and put up a score of 174/6, Rajasthan failed to chase down 174 and lost the match by 37 runs. The team went on to lose 3 games. The Royals snapped their 3 match losing streak by beating Sunrisers Hyderabad. SRH batted first and posted a decent score of 158/4, Rajasthan lost the big wickets, but it was the unbeaten 69 run partnership of Rahul Tewatia and Riyan Parag which helped Royals to win the match by 5 wickets. The Royals continued to lose against Delhi and Bangalore. But they won against Chennai Super Kings by 7 wickets and then witnessed a loss against Sunrisers. But Royals were back in the game against Mumbai.Mumbai posted a good score of 195/4, but it was Ben Stokes and Sanju Samson whose 152 run partnership lead Royals to a 8-wicket win. They won against Kings XI Punjab, Ben Stokes being the Man of the Match again. They lost in the last group game against Kolkata Knight Riders by 60 runs. Therefore, Rajasthan were knocked out of the tournament finishing on 8th position.

Squad
 Players with international caps are listed in bold.

Administration and support staff

Kit manufacturers and sponsors

Teams and standings

Results by match

League table

League stage

Statistics

Most runs

 Source:Cricinfo

Most wickets

 Source:Cricinfo

Player of the match awards

References

2020 Indian Premier League
Rajasthan Royals seasons
2020s in Rajasthan